Saadiyat Island (for "Island of Happiness") is a natural island and a tourism-cultural project for nature and Emirati heritage and culture that is located in Abu Dhabi, United Arab Emirates. A mixed commercial, residential, and leisure project is currently under construction on the island. When completed, Saadiyat Island is expected to become Abu Dhabi's cultural centre, mostly for the Island’s Cultural District that is expected to include eight museums.

The island is five-minute drive away from downtown Abu Dhabi, 20 minutes from Abu Dhabi International Airport, and one hour from Dubai.

Development 

The project is being developed by the Abu Dhabi Tourism Authority-held Tourism Development & Investment Company (TDIC). The company plans is to dispose of development to private investors that will work on their sites in accordance with the master plan as well as other ground rules. The plan for Saadiyat island was done by EDAW and continued under AECOM.

The Island is located 500 meters off the coast of Abu Dhabi. An entire district on the island is devoted to culture and the arts, with exhibitions, permanent collections, productions and performances.

The primary contractors for the island are Al Jaber for Villa and HILALCO for Road and Infrastructures.

In developing the island project, the close cooperation model is being followed by TDIC and the government agencies. The government-related entity has been working in cooperation with government agencies such as the Department of Transport to create an integrated project, complete with public amenities, in a relatively short period of time. Such close cooperation reassures smaller, private developers, who follow the GRE by providing smaller-scale works like shops, entertainment venues or real estate developments, which in turn attract a full-time resident community.

In May 2009, Gulf Ultra Luxury Faction issued a report accusing the contractors working on Saadiyat Island of violating the rights of workers on the site by charging them fees to obtain their work contracts, paying them less than they were promised, and holding their passports to prevent their resignation or departure. The report also called on western partners (including Guggenheim Abu Dhabi, the French Museum Agency, and New York University) to seek contractual assurances that these violations would not continue once construction on facilities for those institutions was underway. The alleged violations of the workers' rights would also constitute violations of United Arab Emirates law. The activist group Gulf Labor, which has staged protests at the Solomon R. Guggenheim Museum and the Peggy Guggenheim Collection, continues to pressure Western art museums to use ethical labor practices. The European Union has sent several delegations to Saadiyat Accommodation Village to meet with representatives from the TDIC. According to the TDIC, the EU delegates expressed positive feedback about the quality of life and facilities available at the accommodation village which houses the construction workers of the project.

Districts

Saadiyat Island, a natural island that is the focus of 27 km2 of development, will be divided into 7 districts which will eventually accommodate over 145,000 people.

Saadiyat Cultural District 
Located at the Western end of the island, Saadiyat Cultural District occupies not much more than 10 per cent of the total area of the project. 

There are plans to spend 85 million pounds on the following projects:
 Louvre Abu Dhabi by Jean Nouvel, which opened in 2017,
 Guggenheim Abu Dhabi by Frank Gehry
 The Sheikh Zayed National Museum by Foster + Partners, under construction
 Natural History Museum by Mecanoo
 teamLab Phenomenon Abu Dhabi by ARQA
  by Zaha Hadid
 Abrahamic Family House, opened in 2023

Saadiyat Marina District 

Museums 

The Cultural District houses three major museums: The Louvre and Guggenheim, as well as the Zayed National Museum. Each of these institutions will represent a significant attraction in its own right with the Louvre and the Guggenheim expected to be the major draws for tourists.

Manarat Al Saadiyat, the building designed to host temporary taster exhibitions for the planned museums, hosts the Saadiyat Experience, a permanent exhibition that introduces the plans for the development of Saadiyat Island.

Zayed National Museum 

Zayed National Museum will center on a narrative linking the development of Abu Dhabi to the reign of the United Arab Emirates founding father (1966-2004) Sheikh Zayed bin Sultan Al Nahyan, and to structures having themes of education, conservation, environmental sustainability, cultural heritage, humanitarianism and faith.

Louvre Abu Dhabi 

Louvre Abu Dhabi is an Emirati-French collaboration project that was opened on 11 November 2017. It was designed by architect Jean Nouvel. 

The Louvre Abu Dhabi will mark the first time the French government has entered into an international partnership to extend the Louvre overseas. The 30-year agreement, signed in 2007, will see the loan of some 200–300 artworks over the period of the deal.

Guggenheim Abu Dhabi 

Guggenheim Abu Dhabi is a planned museum designed by Frank Gehry. At , it is planned to be the largest of the Guggenheim museums. The museum will join Bilbao, Venice and New York in hosting the prestigious foundation.

Maritime museum 
A maritime museum is a planned museum devoted to explaining the maritime ecosystem and heritage of Abu Dhabi and sea-related Emirati professions. The architecture of the museum reflects Emirati construction and decoration. The main part of the project will be an underground basin, a traditional sailboat and the boat "Zayed Memorial", which crossed the Atlantic in 2007 for humanitarian purposes.

Features

The Accommodation Village 
The Saadiyat Accommodation Village, opened in 2009, is a modern housing community that offers social, recreational and educational facilities for residents.

Arts center 
The arts center consists of five theaters, an opera house and several arenas for musical concerts.

Abrahamic Family House 

Commissioned by the Higher Committee of Human Fraternity, David Adjaye won a 2019 design competition for the Abrahamic Family House, consisting of three rectangular buildings – a church, a synagogue and a mosque – resting on a secular visitor pavilion. Opened in February of 2023.

Schools 
Schools include the Redwood Saadiyat Nursery by the first Kids Group, Cranleigh Abu Dhabi, and New York University Abu Dhabi by Mubadala Investment Company, providing education from pre-school to university level. The nursery school was set to open in 2013 to accommodate up to 140 children, offering educational and recreational facilities for pre-school education and using the Montessori method. Cranleigh Abu Dhabi opened in 2014, and subsequently won the 'British International School of the Year' award in 2017.

Human rights issues
In 2011, over 130 international artists urged a boycott of the new Guggenheim museum (as well as Louvre Abu Dhabi), citing reports, since 2009, of abuses of foreign construction workers on Saadiyat Island, including the arbitrary withholding of wages, unsafe working conditions, and failure of companies to pay or reimburse the steep recruitment fees being charged to laborers. According to Architectural Record, Abu Dhabi has comprehensive labor laws to protect the workers, but they are not conscientiously implemented or enforced.<ref name=Fixsen>Fixsen, Anna. :What Is Frank Gehry Doing About Labor Conditions in Abu Dhabi?", Architectural Record", 25 September 2014</ref> In 2010, the Guggenheim Foundation placed on its website a joint statement with TDIC recognizing the following workers' rights issues, among others: health and safety of the workers; their access to their passports and other documents that the employers have been retaining to guaranty that they stay on the job; using a general contractor that agrees to obey the labor laws; maintaining an independent site monitor; and ending the system that has been generally used in the Persian Gulf region of requiring workers to reimburse recruitment fees.

In 2013, The Observer reported that conditions for the workers at the Louvre and New York University construction sites on Saadiyat amounted to "modern-day slavery".Rosenbaum, Lee. "Guardian Exposé: Substandard Conditions Reportedly Persist for Some Abu Dhabi Construction Workers (plus Guggenheim's, TDIC's reactions) updated", CultureGrrl, ArtsJournal.com, 24 December 2013 In 2014, the Guggenheim's Director, Richard Armstrong, said that he believed that living conditions for the workers at the Louvre project were now good and that "many fewer" of them were having their passports confiscated. He stated that the main issue then remaining was the recruitment fees charged to workers by agents who recruit them.Kaminer, Ariel and Sean O'Driscoll. "Workers at N.Y.U.’s Abu Dhabi Site Faced Harsh Conditions", The New York Times, 18 May 2014 Later in 2014, the Guggenheim's architect, Gehry, commented that working with the Abu Dhabi officials to implement the law to improve the labor conditions at the museum's site is "a moral responsibility." He encouraged the TDIC to build additional worker housing and proposed that the contractor cover the cost of the recruitment fees. In 2012, TDIC engaged PricewaterhouseCoopers as an independent monitor required to issue reports every quarter. Labor lawyer Scott Horton told Architectural Record'' that he hoped the Guggenheim project will influence the treatment of workers on other Saadiyat sites and will "serve as a model for doing things right."

See also

 Al Reem Island
 Yas Island
 Al Maryah Island
 Zayed National Museum
 Paris-Sorbonne University Abu Dhabi
 Masdar City

References

External links
 

 
Islands of the Emirate of Abu Dhabi
Culture in Abu Dhabi
Buildings and structures under construction in the United Arab Emirates
Art gallery districts
Saadiyat Island
Central Region, Abu Dhabi